is a Japanese cross-country skier. She competed in five events at the 1992 Winter Olympics.

References

External links
 

1969 births
Living people
Japanese female cross-country skiers
Olympic cross-country skiers of Japan
Cross-country skiers at the 1992 Winter Olympics
Sportspeople from Yamagata Prefecture
Asian Games medalists in cross-country skiing
Cross-country skiers at the 1990 Asian Winter Games
Asian Games gold medalists for Japan
Asian Games silver medalists for Japan
Medalists at the 1990 Asian Winter Games
Universiade gold medalists for Japan
Universiade medalists in cross-country skiing
Competitors at the 1993 Winter Universiade
20th-century Japanese women